Sreeraman Chira is a fresh water lake which contains 900 hectares of paddy fields situated in Chemmappilly near Triprayar of Thrissur district of Kerala state in India. The lake is linked to Ramayana fame, where the Chira kettal ceremony reminiscent of the Sethubandhanam where Hanuman and his army built Rama Setu to reach Sri Lanka and rescue Sita from the Rakshasa King, Ravana.

Binding of the bund

The Chira kettal (binding of the bund) is a sacred religious ceremony performed by a team of priest from Thriprayar Temple.

References

External links

Geography of Thrissur district
Tourist attractions in Thrissur district